Air Cargo Mongolia is a Mongolian airline purely operating in air cargo services. It received its air cargo operator's certificate (AOC) from the Civil Aviation Authority of Mongolia in May 2013 and was expected to launch its operation in 2014.

Destinations 
The airline was to charter flights to any domestic, Asian, or European destination. Range fully loaded 7540 км (4070 nm).

Fleet 
The Air Cargo Mongolia fleet includes the following aircraft (as of March 2014):

See also 

 List of airports in Mongolia
 List of airlines of Mongolia

References

External links
Company's website

Airlines of Mongolia
Airlines established in 2007
2007 establishments in Mongolia
Cargo airlines
Companies based in Ulaanbaatar